Vladimir Grigoryevich Shukhov (– 2 February 1939) was a Russian Empire and Soviet engineer-polymath, scientist and architect renowned for his pioneering works on new methods of analysis for structural engineering that led to breakthroughs in industrial design of the world's first hyperboloid structures, diagrid shell structures, tensile structures, gridshell structures, oil reservoirs, pipelines, boilers, ships and barges. He is also the inventor of the first cracking method.

Besides the innovations he brought to the oil industry and the construction of numerous bridges and buildings, Shukhov was the inventor of a new family of doubly curved structural forms. These forms, based on non-Euclidean hyperbolic geometry, are known today as hyperboloids of revolution. Shukhov developed not only many varieties of light-weight hyperboloid towers and roof systems, but also the mathematics for their analysis. Shukhov is particularly reputed for his original designs of hyperboloid towers such as the Shukhov Tower.

Biography

Vladimir Shukhov was born in a town of Graivoron, Belgorod uezd, Kursk Governorate (in present-day Belgorod Oblast) into a petty noble family. His father Grigory Ivanovich Shukhov was a minor government official, promoted for his efforts in the Crimean War. For a while, Grigory served as Mayor of Graivoron and later as an administrator in Warsaw.

In 1864 Vladimir entered Saint Petersburg gymnasium from which he graduated with distinction in 1871. During his high school years he showed mathematical talents, once demonstrating to his classmates and teacher an original proof of the Pythagorean theorem. The teacher praised his skills but he failed the grade for violating the textbook's guidelines.

After graduating from the gymnasium, Shukhov entered the Imperial Moscow Technical School, in which his teachers included Pafnuty Chebyshev, Aleksey Letnikov, and Nikolay Zhukovsky. In the beginning of the year 1876 Shukhov graduated from school with distinction and a Gold Medal. Chebyshev offered him a job as a lecturer in mathematics at the Imperial Moscow Technical School, but Shukhov decided to seek a job in the engineering industry instead.

In May 1876 Shukhov went to Philadelphia, to work on the Russian pavilion at the Centennial Exposition, the first official World's Fair in the United States, and to study the inner workings of the American construction and engineering industries. During his stay in the US, Shukhov came to know a Russian-American entrepreneur, Alexander Veniaminovich Bari who also worked on the organization of the Fair.

In 1877 Shukhov returned to Russia and joined the drafting office of the Warsaw–Vienna railroad. Within several months, Shukhov's frustration with standard and routine engineering made him abandon the office and join a military-medical academy.

On his coming to Russia in 1877, Bari persuaded Shukhov to give up his medical education and to assume the office of Chief Engineer in a new company specializing in innovative engineering. Shukhov worked with Bari at this company until the October Revolution. He also brought in Leonid Leibenson. Their works revolutionized many areas of civil engineering, ship engineering, and oil industry. The thermal cracking method, the Shukhov cracking process, was patented by Vladimir Shukhov in 1891.

Shukhov always found time for a passionate hobby – photography. The photographic works of Shukhov opened new trends ahead of their flourishing of fine art photography. He made photos in various genres: reporting, city landscape, portrait, constructivism. About two thousand photos and negatives made by Shukhov have survived until this day.

After the October Revolution Shukhov decided to stay in the Soviet Union despite having received alluring job offers from all around the world. Many signal Soviet engineering projects of the 1920s were associated with his name. In 1919 he framed his slogan: We should work independently from politics. The buildings, boilers, beams would be needed and so would we. In the later 1930s during the Great Purge he retired from engineering work but was not arrested or persecuted.

Shukov died on 2 February 1939 in Moscow and was buried at the Novodevichy Cemetery. His many honours included the Lenin Prize (1929) and the title of Hero of Labour (1932).

Works

Vladimir Shukhov is often referred as the Russian Edison for the sheer quantity and quality of his pioneering works . He was one of the first to develop practical calculations of stresses and deformations of beams, shells and membranes on elastic foundation. These theoretical results allowed him to design the first Russian oil tanker, new types of oil tanker barges, and a new type of oil reservoirs. The same principle of the shell on an elastic foundation allowed him to theoretically calculate the optimal diameter, wall thickness and fluid speed for fluid pipelines. Shukhov's projects were instrumental in constructing:

An oil pipeline, the first in the Russian Empire, between Balkhany and Cherny Gorod near Baku (12 km, 1878 complete, used by the Branobel). By 1883 the total length of Shukhov-designed, Bari-built oil pipelines in Baku exceeded 94 km, transporting 30,000 barrels of oil per day. In 1894, a similar pipeline network was built in Grozny. Shukhov designed the first Trans-Caucasian kerosene pipeline between Baku and Batumi (835 km long) and Grozny-Tuapse pipeline (618 km long).
A superior design for water-mains. Shukhov designed (and Bari built) complete water-supply systems for the cities of Cherkassy, Tambov, Kharkov, Voronezh and many others. In that age of infectious diseases his water-supply systems likely saved thousands of lives.
A superior design for oil-tanker barges (less than half of the metal previously required), 84 150-meters long barges were built (mostly for the Volga river) as well as the first Russian seaworthy oil tanker ship. His approach to the ship strength analysis (using the model of a shell on an elastic foundation) was absolutely novel for that time.
Shukhov-designed inexpensive oil tanks with the bottom calculated as a membrane on elastic foundation. They became very popular among oil-producers of the Imperial Russia. By 1881, 130 such tanks were built in Baku alone.

Shukhov made important contributions to the chemical industry:

He designed and built an oil cracking plant. His patents (Shukhov cracking process – patent of Russian empire No. 12926 from 27 November 1891) on cracking were used to invalidate Standard Oil's patents (Burton process – Patent of USA  No. 1,049,667 on 7 January 1913) on oil refineries.
He designed an original oil pump. Shukhov's pumps revolutionized Baku's oil industry allowing to increase its oil output.
He designed one of the first furnaces that used residual oil: before his work residual oil was considered a waste and was discarded, due to his work it became recognized as an important technical product known as a fuel oil.

Shukhov also left a lasting legacy to the Constructivist architecture of early Soviet Russia. As a leading specialist of metallic structures (hyperboloid structures, thin-shell structures, tensile structures), he may be compared with Gustave Eiffel. Shukhov's innovative and exquisite constructions still grace many towns across the former Russian Empire:

Eight thin-shell structures exhibition pavilions for the All-Russia Exhibition in Nizhny Novgorod of 1896, covering the area of 27,000 m², and featuring an unorthodox water-tower that served as a model for more than 30 similar structures built in Imperial Russia, and thousands around the world now.
About 200 original towers (hyperboloid steel gridshells) all over the world, the most famous being the 160-meter-high Shukhov Tower in Moscow (1922) and 70-meter-high Adziogol Lighthouse near Kherson (1910). On Shukhov's 110th birthday in 1963 Soviet Union issued a postal stamp showing Shukhov and his tower (pictured).
Spacious elongated shop galleries, bridged with innovative metal-and-glass vaults, notably the Upper Trade Rows on Red Square (1889–94), Pushkin Museum of Fine Arts  (1898–1912) and Petrovka Passage (1903–06).
Enormous metal arch vaulting for the Municipal Railway Park (1908) and the Kievskiy Railway Station in Moscow (1912–17).
The colossal hall of the Central Post Office, Moscow (1911–13).
Truss-supported metal framework for the Central Universal Store in Moscow (1906–08).
A rotating scene for the Moscow Art Theatre.
Several Constructivist projects, designed in collaboration with Konstantin Melnikov,  notably the Bakhmetevsky Bus Garage (1926–28) and Novo-Ryazanskaya Street Garage (1926–29).
More than 180 bridges across the Volga, Yenisey, Dnieper, and other rivers.
Stabilization Minaret of the Madrasah Ulugh Beg in Samarkand (Shukhov's last engineering work).

Major works

 Grozny-Tuapse pipeline
 Shukhov Tower
 Shukhov Rotunda
 Adziogol Lighthouse
 Shukhov tower on the Oka River
 Pushkin Museum
 Moscow GUM
 Novo-Ryazanskaya Street Garage
 Bakhmetevsky Bus Garage
 Kievskiy Railway Station
 Hotel Metropol (Moscow)
 Petrovsky Passage
 Lattice mast

Gallery

See also

 Shukhov cracking process
 Gridshell
 Diagrid
 Hyperboloid structure
 Tensile and membrane structures
 Constructivist architecture
 Pylons of Cádiz
 All-Russia exhibition 1896
 History of structural engineering

References
 

 Shukhov and Oil Industry
  – video
  – architectural works
 Biography of Shukhov
 
 Karl-Eugen Kurrer, "The History of the Theory of Structures: From Arch Analysis to Computational Mechanics", 2008, 
 Ekaterina Nozhova, "Networks of Construction", 2016, 
 "The Nijni-Novgorod exhibition: Water tower, room under construction, springing of 91 feet span", "The Engineer", No. 19 March 1897, pp. 292–294, London, 1897.
 William Craft Brumfield: "The Origins of Modernism in Russian Architecture", University of California Press, 1991, .
 Elizabeth C. English: "Invention of Hyperboloid Structures", Metropolis & Beyond, 2005.
 Elizabeth C. English: “Arkhitektura i mnimosti”: The origins of Soviet avant-garde rationalist architecture in the Russian mystical-philosophical and mathematical intellectual tradition”, a dissertation in architecture, 264 p., University of Pennsylvania, 2000.
 Valeri Fedorov: "Telecommunications grid architecture in the former Soviet Union", Global Consultants, 1992, 
 Photographic works of Shukhov

 
 Die sparsame Konstruktion
 Rainer Graefe, Jos Tomlow: “Vladimir G. Suchov 1853–1939. Die Kunst der sparsamen Konstruktion.”, 192 S., Deutsche Verlags-Anstalt, Stuttgart, 1990, .
 Jesberg, Paulgerd: "Die Geschichte der Bauingenieurkunst", Deutsche Verlags-Anstalt, Stuttgart (Germany), 1996; pp. 198–9.
 Ricken, Herbert: "Der Bauingenieur", Verlag für Bauwesen, Berlin (Germany), 1994; pp. 230.
  Suchov und Gaudi

 Picon, Antoine (dir.): "L'art de l'ingenieur : constructeur, entrepreneur, inventeur", Éditions du Centre Georges Pompidou, Paris, 1997, 
 
 Fausto Giovannardi: "Vladimir G. Shukhov e la leggerezza dell’acciaio", Borgo San Lorenzo, 2007.

 Шухов В. Г.: Избранные труды, том 1, «Строительная механика», 192 стр., под ред. А. Ю. Ишлинского, Академия наук СССР, Москва, 1977.
 Шухов В. Г.: Избранные труды, том 2, «Гидротехника», 222 стр., под ред. А. Е. Шейндлина, Академия наук СССР, Москва, 1981.
 Шухов В. Г.: Избранные труды, том 3, «Нефтепереработка. Теплотехника», 102 стр., под ред. А. Е. Шейндлина, Академия наук СССР, Москва, 1982.
 Грефе Р. и др.: «В. Г. Шухов (1853—1939). Искусство конструкции.», «Мир», Москва, 1994, .
 Шухова Е. М.: «Владимир Григорьевич Шухов. Первый инженер России.», 368 стр., Изд. МГТУ, Москва, 2003, .
 "В.Г.Шухов – выдающийся инженер и ученый", Труды Объединенной научной сессии Академии наук СССР, посвященной научному и инженерному творчеству почетного академика В.Г.Шухова. М.: Наука, 1984, 96 с.
 Петропавловская И.А.: "Владимир Григорьевич Шухов, 1853–1939", Москва, "Наука", 2004, .
 Российский государственный архив научно-технической документации (РГАНТД): "Документальное наследие выдающегося российского инженера В.Г. Шухова в архивах" (межархивный справочник), ред. Шапошников А.С., Медведева Г.А.; 181 стр., издание РГАНТД, Москва, 2008.

 
1853 births
1939 deaths
People from Belgorod Oblast
People from Grayvoronsky Uyezd
Nobility from the Russian Empire
Photographers from the Russian Empire
Bridge engineers
Soviet chemical engineers
Constructivist architects
Hydraulic engineers
Hyperboloid structures
Modernist architects
Architects from the Russian Empire
Engineers from the Russian Empire
Inventors from the Russian Empire
Scientists from the Russian Empire
Soviet architects
Soviet engineers
Soviet photographers
Structural engineers
Systems engineers
Tensile membrane structures
Tensile architecture
Lighthouse builders
Bauman Moscow State Technical University alumni
Corresponding Members of the USSR Academy of Sciences
Honorary Members of the USSR Academy of Sciences
Burials at Novodevichy Cemetery
Articles containing video clips